The 1985 Daytona 500, the 27th running of the event, was held on February 17, 1985, at Daytona International Speedway, in Daytona Beach, Florida.

Race report
Bill Elliott won the pole at a then-record speed of 205.114 mph. After a mediocre run in the Busch Clash, Elliott nearly lapped the field in his 125-mile qualifying race, then thoroughly dominated the Daytona 500, leading 136 of the 200 laps in his #9 Coors/Melling Ford Thunderbird. The race restarted on the last lap after a Neil Bonnett spin out with less than four laps to go; Bonnett got out of his car and was credited for a 10th-place finish. The race saw a number of engine problems, which knocked many of the contenders, including former Daytona 500 winners David Pearson, A. J. Foyt, Benny Parsons, Bobby Allison, and two-time defending race winner Cale Yarborough, who was trying to win his third straight Daytona 500 victory.

The only car that could consistently run with Elliott was Cale Yarborough, and when his engine went up in smoke on lap 62 the race was for all intents and purposes over. Hendrick Motorsports landed its first big-time full-season sponsorship for 1985 with Levi Garrett chewing tobacco coming aboard to sponsor the #5 Chevrolet of Geoff Bodine. The car's first points race in its new yellow-and-white paint scheme saw Bodine post a solid top-10 run, kicking off a several-year partnership.

There were 12 cars that were knocked out just from engine problems; with a lot of big names affected (Neil Bonnett, who somehow finished 10th even with a blown engine; defending champion Terry Labonte; both Parsons brothers; Kyle Petty; Harry Gant; David Pearson; Bobby Allison and 2-time defending Daytona 500 champion Cale Yarborough among them).

Qualifying

Qualifying results

Failed to qualify

Finishing Order

(5) Indicates 5 bonus points added to normal race points scored for leading 1 lap(10) Indicates 10 bonus points added to normal race points scored for leading 1 lap & leading the most laps

Cautions
5 for 18 laps

Lap Leader Breakdown
Lead changes: 22

Notes
This was Chrysler's last entry in the Daytona 500 as Mopar disappeared from the sport (Cup racing) completely until 2001. Morgan Shepherd drove Buddy Arrington's Chrysler's Imperial to a solid 15th place finish. Until 2016, this was the last Daytona 500 with a field of 40 cars.

First Daytona 500 Start: Ken Schrader.
Last Daytona 500 Starts: Bobby Wawak, Clark Dwyer, Lennie Pond, Slick Johnson, Dick Brooks, and David Pearson.

Standings after the race

References

Daytona 500
Daytona 500
Daytona 500
NASCAR races at Daytona International Speedway